Henry Frewen Le Fanu (1 April 1870 – 9 September 1946) was an Anglican bishop in Australia.

Early life 
Le Fanu was born in Dublin, Ireland. He was educated at Haileybury and Keble College, Oxford.

Religious life 
Le Fanu was ordained in 1894, he began his ecclesiastical career as a curate in Poplar. From 1899 to 1901 he was Chaplain to the Bishop of Rochester after which he held a similar post at Guy's Hospital. Emigrating to Australia he was successively Canon Residentiary and Archdeacon of St John's Cathedral, Brisbane (1904–1915), Coadjutor Bishop of Brisbane (1915–1929), Archbishop of Perth and Primate of Australia. He was consecrated a bishop on 21 September 1915 at the cathedral by St Clair Donaldson, Archbishop of Brisbane, and appointed a Sub-Prelate of the Order of St John of Jerusalem.

Legacy 
His former house in Cottesloe, Western Australia is named after him.

References

Further reading

External links

1870 births
Christian clergy from Dublin (city)
People educated at Haileybury and Imperial Service College
Alumni of Keble College, Oxford
Anglican archbishops of Perth
Assistant bishops in the Anglican Diocese of Brisbane
Primates of the Anglican Church of Australia
Holders of a Lambeth degree
1946 deaths
Sub-Prelates of the Venerable Order of Saint John